River Sioux is an unincorporated community and census-designated place in Harrison County, Iowa, United States. As of the 2010 Census the population was 59.

Demographics

History
River Sioux was platted in 1868 when the railroad was extended to that point. It was named after the nearby Little Sioux River.

Education
River Sioux is zoned to the West Harrison Community School District.

References

Census-designated places in Iowa
Census-designated places in Harrison County, Iowa
Unincorporated communities in Iowa
Unincorporated communities in Harrison County, Iowa
Iowa populated places on the Missouri River
Populated places on the Missouri River